John Patton Anderson (born 2 October 1972) is a Scottish football coach and former player, who played as a defender. He had been the under-18s manager at Leeds United. He was manager at North Ferriby United between 2010 and 2011.

Playing career

Anderson played the majority of his career in Scotland with Greenock Morton and Livingston, before finishing his career in England with Hull City and Bristol Rovers.

Coaching career
He took over as manager of Northern Premier League Premier Division club North Ferriby United in October 2010, having been assistant manager since 2007. He resigned from this post less than a year later on 11 September 2011, after a turbulent start to the 2011–12 season. After leaving North Ferriby he joined his former club, Hull City, in November 2013 he was appointed as Lead Youth Development Coach looking after the U12's to the U16's.

In August 2015, Anderson joined Daral Pugh from Hull City in joining Championship rivals, Leeds United, with Anderson becoming Leeds' Under 18's Manager.

On 24 June 2016, Anderson left his role as Under 18's Manager at Leeds United as part of Leeds' academy re-structuring.

References

External links
 

1972 births
Living people
Footballers from Greenock
Scottish footballers
Association football defenders
Greenock Morton F.C. players
Livingston F.C. players
Hull City A.F.C. players
Bristol Rovers F.C. players
Scottish Premier League players
Scottish Football League players
English Football League players
Scottish football managers
North Ferriby United A.F.C. managers
Northern Premier League managers